Darius Alvin Brown (November 3, 1869 – November 3, 1938) was Mayor of Kansas City, Missouri from 1910 to 1912.

Biography
Brown was born on November 3, 1869 in Wabaunsee County, Kansas. He attended public schools in Topeka, Kansas and received his law degree from the University of Michigan in 1893.  He moved to Kansas City in 1891, where was a city attorney and circuit court judge,  before being elected mayor in 1910. Brown served one two-year term.

References

1869 births
1911 deaths
People from Wabaunsee County, Kansas
Politicians from Topeka, Kansas
Mayors of Kansas City, Missouri
University of Michigan Law School alumni
19th-century American politicians
Missouri Republicans